The 2012 Monza GP3 Series round was a GP3 Series motor race held on September 10 and 11, 2012 at Autodromo Nazionale Monza, Italy. It was the eighth and final round of the 2012 GP3 Series. The race supported the 2012 Italian Grand Prix.

MW Arden driver Mitch Evans secured the 2012 GP3 championship in the Race 2 when his nearest title rival, Daniel Abt failed to secure enough points to take the title himself.

This was also the final race for the original GP3 car, the Dallara GP3/10, as it was replaced in 2013 by the GP3/13.

Classification

Qualifying

notes:
 — Tamás Pál Kiss was given a ten-place grid penalty for causing an avoidable accident with Fabiano Machado during free practice.
 — Kevin Ceccon was given a five-place grid penalty after qualifying for causing an avoidable collision.

Race 1

Race 2

Standings after the round

Drivers' Championship standings

Teams' Championship standings

 Note: Only the top five positions are included for both sets of standings.

See also 
 2012 Italian Grand Prix
 2012 Monza GP2 Series round

References

Monza
Monza GP3